Husri is a town and union council of Hyderabad District in the Sindh province of Pakistan. It is part of the rural Taluka of Hyderabad and is located at 25°19'0N 68°25'0E and lies to the south-east of the capital, Hyderabad. Husri is situated near Bihar Colony, a well-known larger housing society. Husri plays an important role in Hyderabad's and to a certain extent, Sindh's politics. A recent study concluded through internal information gathered by elderly residents of the town proposed that this town is known to be over 100 years old. Husri involves locals that are a part of the 'Sindh' proclaimed as villagers that are one of the most marginalized groups in the region and part of the country's agricultural sector in Interior Sindh.  Besides, after the 1947 Partition, the majority of India remained stranded, leading to the migration of locals from Bihar District of India and numerous Hindus occupied portion of land for residency. They are still situated within the local town, near the nearby streamline of water originating from Indus River (Sindh Dariya) in abundance. The population variety is observable due to presence of Muhajirs, Sindhis, Biharis, Hindus, and other respective groups co-exist. Husri villagers, religious preachers, shopkeepers, businessmen, landlords, social workers, students all have a long and proud history and play an important role in Husri's cultural heritage. This micro city has a widespread abundance of garments, toys etc. Various politicians from Sindh visit this diversified town. It is widely known for its politics. Most of the town supports PPP (Pakistan's Peoples Party). In Pakistan, figures indicate that intake of vitamin-rich foods is a challenge for many people. As compared to Hyderabad food, often in towns/urban areas such as Husri Union Council, the local diets (food quality, oil) are inadequate in terms of nutrient consumption, which eventually leads to undernutrition contributing to the decline of cognitive skills in the long run. However, the upper-class sector of peoples & financially equipped locals within the region can often visit Hyderabad to purchase groceries, re-fill food/pharmaceutical stocks back in the town, buy furniture & building materials, etc. to enhance the living standard of Husri.

Locals 
There are various popular figures in this town. Some of the popular ones are from a village called "Jaro Panhwar" that include Engineer Shah Zaman, Prof. Shah Jahaan Panhwar SPLA President Sindh, and Professor Mehboob Sarwari, former secretary general of Sindhi Adabi Board that unfortunately passed away in year 2018. Furthermore, union council Husri chairman Abdullah Shoro, Murtaza Shoro, etc.

Political State 
MPA Abdul Jabbar Khan and MNA Syed Tariq Ali Shah Jamote contested in the 2018 Pakistan elections within the local constituency PS 64 - Hyderabad and won by a large cohort of votes compared to other political party candidates. However, there lies revolt & frustration within the Husri locals and nearby villages claiming that they have not fulfilled their promises in bettering lives & comforts through road construction, providing gas line, etc.

Renovation Works 
In addition, there has been recent renovation works happening during the year 2020 to build roads using stone blocks within the inner town. However, the challenge to better the internal infrastructural layout of the town city rises due to unplanned houses built throughout the century neglecting the future road preservation factors. Therefore, most alleyways within the city are decreasing in size. Thereby, the Pakistani Government officials have undergone encroachment operations as local houses were intervening the government land (main road) during the years 2020 and 2021, resulting in disruption of lifestyles & overall beauty of the city.

Forecast 
Pertaining to the union council's growth & future prospects, it is subject to ever-increasing rapid growth where the vacant residential plots are being sold to suit the respective locals such as Makkah Residency led by Kashif Jamil. It is predicted to merge with the nearby housing society Bihar Colony (Hyderabad) in the long term by 2030+.

References 

Union councils of Sindh
Populated places in Sindh